Kanysh Imantayuli Satbayev (Qanyş İmantaiūly Sätbaev; , Kanysh Imantaevich Satpaev) (April 11, 1899 – January 31, 1964) was a Kazakh professor, geologist and one of the founders of Soviet metallogeny (specifically the Kazakhstani school) and the principal advocate and first president of Kazakhstan Academy of Sciences.

He was a Doctor of Geological and Mineralogical Sciences (1942), Professor (1950), Academy of Sciences of the Kazakh SSR (1946), member of the USSR Academy of Sciences (1946), and the first president of the Academy of Sciences of the Kazakh SSR. He is famous as the geologist who discovered the Ulutau-Dzhezkazgan copper deposit that was on at the time the largest projected reserves.

Biography
Satbayev was born in what is today Bayanaul District, in Pavlodar Region; at the time it was in the Pavlodar district of the Semipalatinsk region of the Kazakhstan. Satbayev's interest in geology was sparked in childhood by Tomsk geologist Mikhail Usov. He was the youngest child: he had a brother and sister.

From 1909 to 1911, he studied at the Satpayev Kanysh aul school. In 1911 he entered the Russian-Kazakh school in the city of Pavlodar, where he graduated in 1914 with honors. After graduating from college Kanysh Satpayev, despite the objections of Imants father he went to study at the teachers' seminary in Semipalatinsk, where due to tuberculosis he had health problems. Nevertheless, he received a diploma from the seminary in 1918, passing an external examination.

Kanysh Imantaevich intended to continue his studies to obtain higher education, but people with a certificate from  seminary were accepted in high schools only if they pass the exam in mathematics and a foreign language. The next year and a half Satpayev was preparing for admission to Tomsk Technological Institute. In parallel with studies, Satpayev worked as a teacher of natural science teaching two-year courses in Semipalatinsk.

The work and training had to be postponed due to the worsening of tuberculosis. Almost a year Satpayev held in his native village, taking treatment and recuperating. Doctors believed that he would never be able to continue his studies, and can only live in his native village, in the open air, taking kumiss.

In 1920, Satpayev was appointed the first chairman in Bayanaul Kazkultprosveta (Department for the cultural and educational work among the working people), created with the strengthening of the Soviet power. At the same time the decision of the Revolutionary Committee of Pavlodar, he was appointed a national judge of the 10th section of Bayanaul area.

At the beginning of 1921, there was a meeting with Satpayev geologist MA Usov, who arrived in Bayanaul on kumiss. Usov managed to interest youth in geology, and in the same year, Kanysh Satpayev voluntarily left his post of national judges, being admitted to the Tomsk Technological Institute (now Tomsk Polytechnic University). 

In the beginning of 1922 it has again escalated tuberculosis, and Satpaev had to leave school and go back to the village. Continuation of the study was delivered by doctors under the big question. Not to be outdone by fellow students, Satpayev goes home course. This helps him MA Usov, often coming to Bayanaul on treatment.

Being treated in Bayanaul, Kanysh Satpayev began compiling a textbook on algebra for the Kazakh schools, from which he graduated in 1924. This tutorial is the first school textbook on algebra in the Kazakh language.

After a year and a half Kanysh Imantayevich's health improved, and he returned to his studies at the Institute, successfully graduating in 1926. Satbayev returned to Kazakhstan and became the first qualified Kazakh mining engineer and geologist.

He died in Moscow in 1964, and is buried in Almaty.

Family
Father Kanysh Imantayevich - Imantui Satpayev was bey (head of village). He had a wife Nurum, with whom he lived for more than a quarter century. They had one daughter who died in infancy. This was the reason for their separation. The second wife of Imants - Alim. They had three children: a daughter and two sons Kaziza, Bokesh (Gaziz) and Kanysh.

In 1920, Kanysh Satpayev married Sharip, and they had two daughters - Honeys and Shamshiyabanu. Later, having left Sharipa, Satpayev married Taisiya Alekseevna Satpayeva (Koshkina). They had two daughters - Maria and Meiz.

Daughter - Satpayeva Hannisa Kanyshevna - 1939 she entered the medical school at the Medical Faculty of. In 1943, Honeys Satpayev graduated with honors from the Kazakh State Medical Institute and was appointed its assistant in the department of normal physiology. In 1949, she defended her PhD, in 1968 - a doctorate, in 1970 received the title of professor. From 1974 to 1991 she headed the department of normal physiology ASMI - one of the leading departments of the institute. From 1999 to 2005 she was in charge of the course valeology. She is the founder of valeology. For many years engaged in the preparation of future physicians. Doctor of Medical Sciences, Honored Science of RK. Husband - Kaneko Zharmagambetov was secretary of the Komsomol Central Committee, then Secretary of the Writers' Union, editor of "Bumblebee" magazine. December 23, 2011 Honeys Kanyshevna 90 years. June 11, 2016 Honeys Satpayev died at the age of 94 years.

Career
Research of Dzhezkazgan.

In 1926, after graduating from college and got a qualification of a mining engineer, Kanysh Satpayev was sent to Atbasar trust of non-ferrous metals as head of the geological department, and a year later (in 1927), has been elected a member of the Board of the Trust.

The jurisdiction of the trust was Atbasar copper mine and smelter in the unfinished village Karsakpai. Construction of the plant began a decade ago, when the British took the concession at the bai Karsakpaya area and began a search of copper. They built a smelter partially installed equipment, but a lot of them failed to find copper. With the onset of the February Revolution, the British left the factory, which later decided to finish the Soviet regime. 

Kanysh Satpayev as Chief Geologist Trust, went there to explore the area and learn about the progress of construction works. Specialists involved in mine and factory management about the prospects of development of copper mining in the region was very skeptical. They believed that its reserves will last for the next 10–15 years, not more. However, examining the terrain, Kanysh Imantaevich did not agree with them. He believed that in the Dzhezkazgan area there are huge reserves of copper, which had never been found. Having Geolkom from the allocation of one machine, Satpayev launched a study area for the presence of metal. Guide Geolkom and experts, who were familiar with the Zhezkazgan region, said the idea Kanysh Imantayevich doomed to failure.

However, a year after the start of work, Satpayev came across a large reservoir of ore capacity of more than ten meters. The analysis, conducted in Leningrad, showed that it was a previously unknown ore layer rich in copper. Thanks to this discovery, Satpaev able to expand exploration work in 1928, increasing the number of machines to two. Finding three more large deposits geologist increases the amount of research on the 1929 half. And this year opened three more deposits and one new ore field. In these circumstances, Satpayev published in the journal "The national economy of Kazakhstan," an article that states that potentially Dzhezkazgan represents one of the richest provinces of copper in the world, larger than most provinces of America. Based on their assumptions, Kanysh Imantaevich concludes that the plant located near Karsakpay not master volume produced in Dzhezkazgan ore. He also suggests that the region is necessary to build a dam and pave the broad-gauge railway. With all these suggestions he regularly refers to the higher authorities, it appears in the print media, and even proposes the development of the region in the five-year plan of economic development of the USSR.

Satpayev Offers cause a negative reaction among the leadership of the trust and Geolkom. Instead of a development plan proposed by a young geologist Dzhezkazgan they offer to leave the volumes of research works in the same 1930. Then Satpayev, insisting on being right, to pursue their proposals at the meeting of the mining and metallurgical sector the Supreme Economic Council. After lengthy debate, the Supreme Economic Council agrees with the arguments Geolkom and acknowledges arguments Satpayev not serious. Not wanting to put up with the findings of the Supreme Economic Council, Kanysh Imantaevich spring of 1930 gets an appointment with the chairman of Gosplan Krzhizhanovsky, which justifies its proposals. After that, the exploration of Dzhezkazgan allocated an additional amount of money, drilling equipment and personnel. In the next two years the volume of research work continued to increase. Started agitated Satpayev resolved the issue with the lack of water in the region: he was able to agree on the beginning of the next, 1933, hydrogeological studies in the area to search for water.

However, in early 1933 Geolkom decides on a sharp reduction in funding exploration in Zhezkazgan. It was only by one per cent from last year's amount. The argument in favor of this decision was the lack of infrastructure in the region: there was no iron, no roads, no water, and many other conditions for life. In order to maintain staff, and to continue work Kanysh Imantaevich was forced to seek additional sources of funding. He made an agreement with the trusts' Zolotorazvedka "and" Lakokrassyrё "exploration of minerals they need. However, the available funds were not enough to save either, much less to increase research. Satpayev appealed to the MA Usov and his friend, Professor VA Vanyukov. 

With their help Kanysh Satpaev able to perform in the Soviet Academy of Sciences and to prove the validity of the conclusions made by him concerning reserves of copper ore Dzhezkazgan. The decision of the third session of the Academy in 1934 referred to the need for construction of the third five-year plan in Zhezkazgan copper-smelting plant. The meeting also supported the proposal of Satpayev on construction of the railway line Zhezkazgan - Karagandy - Balkhash. Then Kanysh Imantaevich substantiate their proposals before the people's commissar of heavy industry Ordzhonikidze. After that, in the region began extensive research. Later it turned out that the Dzhezkazgan copper deposit was at that time the largest in the world in terms of the projected reserves. By 1940, in Dzhezkazgan Dosmurzinskoe dam was built and the railway connecting Zhezkazgan, Balkhash and Karaganda.

For services to disclose wealth Ulutauskogo area (opening Dzhezkazgan deposit) Kanysh Satpayev in 1940 was awarded the country's highest award - the Order of Lenin.

The first president of the Academy of Sciences of the Kazakh SSR
Kanysh Satpayev began to reflect on the creation of the Academy of Sciences of Kazakhstan More in 1944. In August of that year, preparatory activities were initiated. Actively conducted correspondence with the Department of Science of the Central Committee of the CPSU. KI Satpayev regularly made trips to Moscow, where he argued the need for the organization of the Academy of Sciences of the Kazakh SSR on the Council bases and branches of the Academy of Sciences of the USSR, Department of Science of the CPSU and the USSR Academy of Sciences. In the period from 1944 to 1946 it was created 11 new research institutes. design of the main building of the future academy has also been developed, authored by architect AV Shchusev.

June 1, 1946 in the Opera and Ballet Theatre building. Abay official opening ceremony of the Academy of Sciences of the Kazakh SSR. Two days later, on June 3 at the first general meeting of the Academy, held in the hall of the Presidium of the Supreme Soviet of the Kazakh SSR sessions Kanysh Satpayev was elected its president and academician. In the same year, Satpayev was elected an academician of the Academy of Sciences of the USSR and a deputy of the Supreme Soviet of the 2 convocation. In 1947 he was elected member of the Presidium of the Committee on Lenin and State Prizes of the USSR Council of Ministers, and remained so until his death.

In 1949, Kanysh Imantaevich was elected a member of the CC CP (b) of Kazakhstan. In 1950, he was confirmed in the academic rank of professor in the specialty "geology" and was elected to the Supreme Soviet of the 3 convocation. In 1951, Satpayev, on behalf of the Presidium of the USSR Academy of Sciences, attended the organizational session of the Academy of Sciences of the Tajik SSR. This session Kanysh Imantaevich was elected an honorary member of the Tajik Academy of Sciences.

Activities after dismissal
After Satpayev was dismissed from his post as head of the Academy of Sciences of the Kazakh SSR, the president of the Union Academy Nesmeyanov suggested that he take the post of chairman of the Ural Branch of the USSR Academy of Sciences. However Kanysh Imantaevich refused and preferred to stay in the Alma-Ata at the post of Director of the Institute of Geological Sciences.

Back in 1942 in the Geological Institute had the idea of drawing up metallogenic prediction maps of minerals in Central Kazakhstan. In 1952, Satpayev gathered a group of geologists and began the implementation of this idea. The group consisted of RA Borukaev, I. Bock, G. Ts Medoev, GN Szczerba, DN Kazanli, IP Novokhatskiy and GB Žilina. A year earlier, in 1951, studies in the same field staff started everything.

In the first year of the research group of scientists led by geologist Satpayev develops different existed before "Complex method formational metallogenic analysis and forecasting of deposits", which later served as the basis for comprehensive metallogenic studies in the USSR. In 1953, they amounted to operating models predictive cards. Also, in parallel with research and development in Almaty held regular conferences to discuss progress and future plans of action. In 1954, the final conference, the results of which forecast map has been recommended to check in a production environment. Following the Institute of Geological Sciences of the Kazakh SSR completes its work on the staff cards of all.

Over the next four years, from 1954 to 1958, maps are checked for accuracy and quality on this topic conducted scientific debate. The final results were announced in December 1958: forecast map, developed by the Institute of Geological Sciences of the Kazakh SSR was recognized as the most accurate. In this regard, a group of geologists led by Kanysh Satpayev was awarded the Lenin Prize.

Legacy
Kanysh Satbayev left after himself more than 640 scientific publications. He created Institute of Geology which became the center of studies of Kazakhstan mineral resources.

Named after K. Satpayev:
 Satpayev city in Karaganda Region
 Kanysh Satbayev Canal (Irtysh–Karaganda Canal)
 Mineral Satpayevite (6Al (OH)3×3v (O2OH)×2v O(OH)2)
 Kazakh National Technical University 
 Numerous streets and schools in Kazakhstan. 
 Asteroid 2402 Satpayev (1979 OR13) in main-belt
 The mountain peak previously called Soviets Peak (Pik Sovetov, 4317m, GPS: 43.023914, 77.037141) was renamed in his honor.
 Satpayev glacier on the northern slope of the ridge Jungar Alatau, the source of the river Lepsy.
 Institute of Geological Sciences of the Academy of Sciences of Kazakhstan to them. KI Satpayev.
 Ekibastuz Engineering and Technical Institute.
Satbayev University named after KI Satpayev (22 September 1999).
 Satpaev Street in the city of Alma-Ata.
 Satbayev Memorial Museum.
 Street in the city of Pavlodar.
 Mining ring structure - Big ring Satpayev.

Today there are a large number of monuments dedicated Kanysh Satpaev.

Recognition
 1940, 1945, 1957, 1963 - 4 Order of Lenin.
 1942 - Order of the Patriotic War, 2nd degree.
 1945 - Medal "For Valiant Labor in the Great Patriotic War of 1941-1945."
 1942 - Stalin Prize.
 1958 - Lenin Prize.
 1951 - honorary member of the Academy of Sciences of the Tajik SSR.
 1964 - The first honorary citizen of the city of Zhezkazgan.
 1977 - The first Honorary Citizen of Satpayev.

Bibliography 
 Publications in English
 Satpaev K.I. Program of Kazakh scientists // Moscow News. 1948. 28 Dec.
 Satpaev K.I. Gigantic strides: (Our party looks into the future) // Moscow News. 1956. 22 Feb.
 Satpaev K.I. Kazakhstan: Tremendous advances // News. 1956. No. 24. P. 21.
 Satpaev K.I. Kazakh scientists contribution // Moscow News. 1959. 4 Mar. P. 6.

About him 
 Satpaev Kanysh Imantaevich // The International who's who. 1963–1964. 27 ed. London: Europa publ., 1963. P. 937.

References

External links
 Kanysh Satpayev Memorial Museum
 Biography of Kanysh Satpayev in Russian

1899 births
1964 deaths
People from Pavlodar Region
People from Semipalatinsk Oblast
Kazakhstani scientists
Full Members of the USSR Academy of Sciences
Tomsk Polytechnic University alumni
Soviet geologists
Recipients of the Order of Lenin